Henshaw is a surname. Notable people with the surname include:

 Alex Henshaw (1912–2007), British air racer and test pilot
 David Henshaw (disambiguation), multiple people
 Ernest Henshaw (1870–1950), Australian politician
 George Holt Henshaw (1831–1891), Canadian engineer and draftsman
 Henry Wetherbee Henshaw (1850–1930), American ornithologist
 Jim Henshaw (born 1949), Canadian actor
 John Henshaw (born 1951), British actor
 John Prentiss Kewly Henshaw (1792–1852), Episcopal Church Bishop of Rhode Island
 Joseph Henshaw (1608–1679), Bishop of Peterborough, England
 Julia Wilmotte Henshaw (1869–1937), Canadian botanist, writer, and ambulance driver in the First World War
 Nathaniel Henshaw (1628–c. 1673) Original Fellow of the Royal Society
 Robbie Henshaw (born 1993), Irish Rugby Union player
 Ross Henshaw (born 1952), former Australian rules footballer
 Roy Henshaw (1911–1993), Major League Baseball pitcher
 Simon Henshaw, American diplomat
 Thomas Henshaw (alchemist) (1618–1700) Original Fellow of the Royal Society with Robert Paston, 1st Earl of Yarmouth
 Thomas Henshaw (benefactor) (1731–1810)
 Thomas Henshaw (bishop) (1873–1938), fifth Bishop of Salford, England

Fictional characters:
 Hank Henshaw, DC Comics' Cyborg Superman
 Elizabeth Henshaw, a character from the 2003 film The Haunted Mansion